Rehman Verma (1927 – 11 August 2007) was a Pakistani music director. He composed playback music for Lollywood's first-ever action movie, Baaghi, in 1956. He was one of the musical duo "Sharma Ji-Verma Ji" along with the Bollywood musician Khayyam before the partition of India and Pakistan in 1947.

Early life and career
Rehman was born as Abdul Rehman in 1927 in India. He started his music career as "Verma Ji" of the musical duo "Sharma Ji-Verma Ji" that was active in the film industry of the undivided Indian subcontinent. His other partner was music composer Khayyam. Both were disciples of the senior musician G.A. Chishti. After 1947, Khayyam remained in Bombay and Rehman decided to work in the newly established Pakistani film industry in Lahore. 

Rehman's first movie in Lollywood was Baaghi, released in 1956. It was the first action-packed film in the history of Pakistani cinema and the first Pakistani film that was screened in China. In 1967, while composing music for the movie Nadira, Rehman taught Kamal Ahmed, who later became an independent music director.

From 1956 to 1976, Rehman created music for 27 Urdu and Punjabi movies. Some of his notable films include Baghi (1956), Aakhri Nishan (1958), Darbar (1958), Alam Ara (1959), Aik Thi Maa (1960), Bombay Wala (1961), Son of Ali Baba (1961), Kala Pani (1963), Ghadaar (1964), Khandan (1964), Khota Paisa (1965), Qabeela (1966), Be Reham (1967), Sassi Punnu (1968), Chor Nale Chattar (1970), Takht-O-Taj (1970), Al-Aasifa (1971), Sipah Salar (1972), Farz Aur Mohabbat (1972), and Laila Majnoo (1973). His last movie, Dara, was released in 1976.

Popular compositions
 1956 (Film: Baghi - Urdu) ... Balam Tum Haar Geye Jeeta Mera Pyar Mano Na Mano, Singer(s): Zubaida Khanum, Poet: Mushir Kazmi
 1956 (Film: Baghi - Urdu) ... Kaisay Kahun Main Al-Widaa Jaun Kahan Main Kya Karun, Singer(s): Zubaida Khanum, Poet: Mushir Kazmi
 1956 (Film: Darbar-e-Habib - Urdu) ... A Khasa-e-Khasan-Russal Waqt-e-Dua Hay Ummat Peh Teri, Singer(s): Zamurrad Bano & Co. 
 1964 (Film: Khandan - Urdu) ... Haal Kaisa Hay Janab Ka Jawab Dijiye Sawal Ka, Singer(s): Mala, Irene Parveen, Batish, Poet: Mushir Kazmi
 1967 (Film: Yaaran Naal Baharan - Punjabi) ... Yaaran Naal Baharan Sajna Jis Dharti Tay Yaar Nein Wasday, Singer(s): Masood Rana, Poet: Manzoor Jhalla
 1967 (Film: Nadira - Urdu) ... Dhina Dhina Dhin Dhina Dil Ko Aaj Dildar Mila, Singer(s): Mala, Najma Niazi & Co., Poet: Muzaffar Warsi
 1968 (Film: Sassi Punnu - Punjabi) ... Jadun Teri Dunya Tun Pyar Tur Jaye Ga, Singer(s): Noor Jehan, Mehdi Hassan, Poet: Ahmad Rahi
 1968 (Film: Sassi Punnu - Punjabi) ... Ni Ajj Mera Gee Karda, Akhan Meech Udharian Maaran, Singer: Mala, Poet: Ahmad Rahi
 1970 (Film: Chor Nalay Chattar - Punjabi) ... Way Lagian Di Lajj Rakh Lein Kidday Bhul Na Javin Anjana'', Singer(s): Noor Jahan, Poet: Manzoor Jhalla

Death
Rehman died on August 11, 2007.

References

1927 births
2007 deaths
Pakistani composers
Pakistani film score composers